The 158th Pennsylvania House of Representatives District is located in Chester County and includes the following areas:

 Avondale
 East Bradford Township
 East Marlborough Township
 London Britain Township
 New Garden Township
 Newlin Township
 West Bradford Township
 West Goshen Township (PART, Districts Middle and South)
 West Marlborough Township

Representatives

References

Government of Chester County, Pennsylvania
158